Huntersville is a historic neighborhood in Norfolk, Virginia. It is located near downtown Norfolk.  One of Norfolk's "most intact settlements remaining from the late 19th century," Huntersville "is unique because it was not planned by a company or commission, but developed over time."

Location
It is bordered on the west by Church Street and Elmwood Cemetery, the north by the Lindenwood neighborhood, the east by Tidewater Drive, and the south by Huntersville Park and the Barberton neighborhood.  More specifically:

History
Part of Huntersville was land that belonged to Samuel Boush c. 1761.  By the end of the 19th century, it "consisted of small frame houses mostly clustered in the area of Church Street."  Huntersville is "one of Norfolk's oldest and most intact settlements remaining from the late 19th century," and "is unique because it was not planned by a company or commission, but developed over time."

At various times, there were "a botanical and zoological park named Lesner's Park ... an 'old Burying Ground'," and several industries, including a railroad and a brewery.  Most of the land at the turn of the century was owned by Caucasians, which included a few prominent residents, but mostly they rented to a "demographic mix" of native Whites, "European immigrants" of Jewish extraction, Asians, and Blacks.  Huntersville was annexed to the city of Norfolk in 1911.

In 1916, a team of canvassers were able to raise $3,500 in donations from the residents of the area in two days, in order to build a hospital, a huge amount for that time.

Neighborhood character
Huntersville is primarily residential in character.  According to the official city history, "It was the only predominantly Black neighborhood to be annexed during the more than 70 years of annexation."  Today, it is, as it was in the early 20th century, a mixed, "cosmopolitan" neighborhood.

It is served by a city of Norfolk community center.  The center provides many social services, including HIV testing, and employment counseling by the Urban League.

The Head Start program has a program in Huntersville.

It appears on some maps as "Olde Huntersville".  In 2007, the Olde Huntersville Development Corp. became defunct after owing over $245,000 it had misspent "in violation of federal regulations."

A Pop Warner football league plays regularly at Huntersville park.

The neighborhood has a large number of poor persons who require indigent burials; according to an area funeral home director, it has recently had three such funerals per month.

References

External links
 Huntersville Neighborhood Center
 Norfolk Redevelopment and Housing Authority
 Site of defunct Olde Huntersville at iBegin
 Old maps of Huntersville, at the Norfolk, Virginia Public Library
 Website of Councilman Paul R. Riddick

Historic districts in Virginia
Neighborhoods in Norfolk, Virginia